Nađa Ninković (born November 1, 1991) is a professional volleyball player from Serbia, who was a member of the Serbia women's national volleyball team that won the gold medal at the 2011 European Championship in Serbia and Italy. She plays for CSM Volei Alba Blaj.

She is daughter of Serbian actor Slobodan Ninković.

Career
Ninković won the bronze medal at the 2015 FIVB Club World Championship, playing with the Swiss club Voléro Zürich.

Awards

Individuals
 2009 European League "Best Blocker"

Clubs
 2015 FIVB Club World Championship -  Bronze medal, with Voléro Zürich

References

External links
 Profile at FIVB
 Boda Ninković - Nađa is my gold (article in Serbian)

1991 births
Living people
Sportspeople from Belgrade
Serbian women's volleyball players
European champions for Serbia
Serbian expatriate sportspeople in Switzerland
Serbian expatriate sportspeople in Italy
Serbian expatriate sportspeople in Romania
Serbian expatriate sportspeople in Brazil
Expatriate volleyball players in Romania